Peter Robert Last is an Australian ichthyologist, curator of the Australian National Fish Collection and a senior principal research scientist at CSIRO Marine and Atmospheric Research (CMAR) in Hobart, Tasmania. He is an  elasmobranch expert and has described many new species of shark.

Last graduated from the University of Tasmania in 1983 with a PhD titled "Aspects of the ecology and zoogeography of fishes from soft-bottom habitats of the Tasmanian shore zone".

Last is the co-author of Sharks and Rays of Australia and co-author of A revision of the Australian handfishes (Lophiiformes: Brachionichthyidae), with descriptions of three new genera and nine new species. In 2009, the Australian Society for Fish Biology awarded Last its highest honour, the K. Radway Allen Award.

See also
:Category:Taxa named by Peter R. Last

Notes

Australian ichthyologists
Living people
Year of birth missing (living people)
University of Tasmania alumni